How to Date Men When You Hate Men is a 2019 non-fiction book written by Blythe Roberson.

Overview
How to Date Men When You Hate Men is a collection of comedic, self-deprecating, and philosophical essays interrogating what it means to date men within contemporary society. Although the title gives the impression that the book offers dating advice, it is instead an exploration of dating in the 21st century and is a "modern response to A Lover's Discourse" by Roland Barthes.

Reception 
A review in The Economist describes the response to the book as " mixed bag", and was irritated by the colloquial style and the many references to Harry Styles. The Booklist review recommends the book for "readers of Phoebe Robinson and other feminist comedy writers". The New York Times review described the book as hilarious, and noted "echoes of the Second Wave's militant political celibates". A review in The New Republic praised the book for exploring "the insoluble truth that Roberson both desires and loathes men. She forces herself to acknowledge that double bind, then persists through the paradox instead of opting out," and describes it as "an invaluable testament to living through heterosexuality".

References

External links
Blythe Roberson on Dating Men While Hating Men

2019 debut works
English-language books
American non-fiction books
2019 non-fiction books
Feminist books
Misandry
Flatiron Books books
Debut books